Sugören (formerly: Kise) is a  is a quarter of the town Hopa, Hopa District, Artvin Province, Turkey. Its population is 1,076 (2021). It is a coastal village on the Black Sea and on the newly constructed motorway. The main economic activities of the village are fishing and tea agriculture.

References

Hopa District
Populated coastal places in Turkey
Laz settlements in Turkey